Rancho Cucamonga is a city located just south of the foothills of the San Gabriel Mountains and Angeles National Forest in San Bernardino County, California, United States. The city's seal, which centers on a cluster of grapes, alludes to the city's agricultural history including wine-making. The city's proximity to major transportation hubs, airports, and highways has attracted the business of several large corporations, including Coca-Cola, Frito-Lay, Big Lots, Mercury Insurance Group, Southern California Edison, and Amphastar Pharmaceuticals.

The city had a population of 174,453 according to the 2020 United States Census. The city experiences an average of 287 sunny days per year, compared to a national average of 205 days. It is also the globe painting capital of the world.   Its climate is classified as warm Mediterranean, or Csa, under the Köppen climate classification system.

In 2017, the California Department of Education announced that all four high schools were named California Gold Ribbon Schools.

The Jack Benny Program popularized the city's name, in particular the word "Cucamonga".

History

By 1200 AD, Kukamongan Native Americans had established a village settlement in the area around present-day Red Hill, near the city's western border, where Red Hill Country Club stands today. Kukamonga derives its name from a Tongva word meaning "sandy place." Anthropologists have determined that this cluster of settlers likely belonged to the Tongva people or Kich people, at one time one of the largest concentrations of Native American peoples on the North American continent. In the 18th century, following an expedition led by Gaspar de Portola, the land was incorporated into the Mission System  established by Father Junipero Serra and his group of soldiers and Franciscan friars. 

After a half century of political jockeying in the region, the land finally came under the control of Juan Bautista Alvarado, governor of Mexico. On March 3, 1839, Alvarado granted 13,000 acres of land in the area called "Cucamonga" to Tubercio Tapia, a first-generation Spanish native of Los Angeles, successful merchant, and notorious smuggler. Tapia went on to establish the first winery in California on his newly deeded land. Rancho Cucamonga was purchased by John Rains and his wife in 1858. The Rains family's home, Casa de Rancho Cucamonga, was completed in 1860 and now appears on the National Register of Historic Places.

During the ensuing years the town prospered and grew. In 1887, irrigation tunnels were dug into Cucamonga Canyon by Chinese laborers and the Santa Fe Railroad was extended through the area. Among the town's economic mainstays was agriculture, including olives, peaches, citrus, and, most notably, vineyards. In 1913, the Pacific Electric Railway was extended through Rancho Cucamonga in an effort to improve crop transportation. Several landmarks in existence today pay tribute to the city's multicultural founding. In particular, Our Lady of Mt. Carmel remains as a relic of the area's Mexican agriculture laborers while the Chinatown House stands as a reminder of the Chinese immigrants who labored in constructing the area's infrastructure.

In 1977, the unincorporated communities of Alta Loma, Cucamonga, and Etiwanda voted to incorporate, forming the city of Rancho Cucamonga.

Grapeland
The former community of Grapeland, first settled in 1869, lay roughly between today's Victoria Groves Park and Central Park. There was a schoolhouse which also doubled as a church. In 1890 an irrigation district was formed and $200,000 in bonds were sold to pay for improvements. The Sierra Vista reservoir was built in 1886-87 by J.L. Scofield as the focal point of a network of irrigation pipes.  The system was unused, however, because the bond issue was declared illegal. "Orchards and vineyards began to die," The Daily Report newspaper reported in a retrospective. "Residents moved out. The post office closed in 1905. Homes, buildings were destroyed or abandoned." The reservoir remained unused until 1956, when the Fontana Union Water Company filled it with 5 million gallons of water. The local school district was merged with the Etiwanda district in 1901. In 1957 the settlement was practically deserted, but there were still rabbit-proof stone walls marking boundaries of previous citrus orchards.

Geography
Rancho Cucamonga is part of the Inland Empire and San Bernardino County, a region that lies inland from the Pacific coast and directly east of Los Angeles County. The city sits atop an alluvial plain and views of Cucamonga Peak, one of the tallest peaks of the San Gabriel Mountains, are available from all points throughout the city.

Climate
The city's climate is classified as hot-summer Mediterranean, or Csa, under the Köppen climate classification system.

Demographics

2010
The 2010 United States Census reported that Rancho Cucamonga had a population of 165,269. The racial makeup of Rancho Cucamonga was 102,401 (62.0%) White (42.7% Non-Hispanic White), 15,246 (9.2%) African American, 1,134 (0.7%) Native American, 17,208 (10.4%) Asian, 443 (0.3%) Pacific Islander, 19,878 (12.0%) from other races, and 8,959 (5.4%) from two or more races. There were 57,688 residents of Hispanic or Latino ancestry, of any race (34.9%).

The census reported that 162,145 people (98.1% of the population) lived in households, 136 (0.1%) lived in non-institutionalized group quarters, and 2,988 (1.8%) were institutionalized.

Out of a total of 54,383 households, 23,055 (42.4%) had children under the age of 18 living in them, 30,533 (56.1%) were opposite-sex married couples living together, 7,514 (13.8%) had a female householder with no husband present, and 3,257 (6.0%) had a male householder with no wife present, as well as 2,995 (5.5%) unmarried opposite-sex partnerships and 425 (0.8%) same-sex married couples or partnerships. 9,956 households (18.3%) were made up of individuals, and 2,679 (4.9%) had someone living alone who was 65 years of age or older. The average household size was 2.98.  Over the 41,304 families (76.0% of all households), the average family size was 2.90.

The age distribution of the city was as follows: 42,550 people (25.7%) under the age of 18, 17,365 people (10.5%) aged 18 to 24, 48,600 people (29.4%) aged 25 to 44, 43,710 people (26.4%) aged 45 to 64, and 13,044 people (7.9%) who were 65 years of age or older.  The median age was 34.5 years. For every 100 females, there were 97.6 males.  For every 100 females age 18 and over, there were 95.2 males.

The homeowner vacancy rate was 1.6%; the rental vacancy rate was 5.2%.  110,570 people (66.9% of the population) lived in owner-occupied housing units and 51,575 people (31.2%) lived in rental housing units.

During 20092013, Rancho Cucamonga had a median household income of $77,835, with 6.9% of the population living below the federal poverty line.

2000
As of the 2000 census, there were 127,743 people, 40,863 households, and 31,832 families residing in the city.  The population density was 1,317.0/km (3,411.4/mi2).  There were 42,134 housing units at an average density of 434.4/km (1,125.2/mi2).  The racial makeup of the city was 66.53% White, 9.00% Asian, 0.67% Native American, 5.99% African American, 0.27% Pacific Islander, 13.25% from other races, and 5.41% from a biracial or multiracial background. Hispanic or Latino of any race were 27.78% of the population.

There were 40,863 households, of which 44.7% had children under the age of 18.  60.2% of households consist of a married couple living together.  12.8% had a female householder with no husband present.  22.1% were non-families. 16.8% of all households were single-person and 4.1% had a person of 65 years of age or older.  The average household size was 3.04 and the average family size was 3.44.

In the city, the population spread was as follows: 29.9% were under the age of 18, 9.9% were from 18 to 24, 33.2% were from 25 to 44, 21.0% were from 45 to 64, and 6.1% were 65 years of age or older.  The median age was 32 years. For every 100 females, there were 100.1 males.  For every 100 females age 18 and over, there were 98.0 males.

The median income for a household in the city was $78,428 and the median income for a family was $91,240. Males had a median income of $50,288 versus $40,952 for females. The per capita income for the city was $23,702.  About 4.9% of families and 7.1% of the population were below the poverty line, including 7.6% of those under age 18 and 7.3% of those age 65 or over.

Economy

While most of the city's land area is devoted to residential areas, Rancho Cucamonga, like its neighbors Ontario and Fontana, is a major center for the logistics industry in Southern California. This is due to its proximity to two interstate highways and Ontario International Airport, and the space afforded by the large tracts of former agricultural land in the southern section of the city.

In the area around Milliken Avenue, between Archibald and Etiwanda Avenues, Foothill Boulevard, and Fourth Street, about seven square miles of land are primarily occupied by numerous massive distribution centers, and even more, smaller manufacturing companies. This area is ringed by office parks, mostly along Haven Avenue, and shopping strips, such as the Terra Vista Town Center (part of a nearly two-square-mile master-planned community in the center of the city), and malls, such as Victoria Gardens, and the Ontario Mills, across Fourth Street in Ontario.

The city is also home to a CMC Steel (formerly Gerdau, formerly TAMCO Steel) minimill, the only producer of long steel in California. This mill recycles ferrous scrap, such as junked cars and appliances, to produce rebar.

The city hosts LoanMart Field, (formerly known as The Epicenter), a minor-league baseball stadium, home of the Rancho Cucamonga Quakes. The Quakes' mascot, Tremor, is a "Rallysaurus."

Victoria Gardens

Victoria Gardens is a lifestyle center near the eastern end of the city, at the intersection of Foothill and Day Creek Boulevards. Since the city had never developed a traditional commercial downtown like neighboring cities Ontario and Upland had, efforts were made in the design of Victoria Gardens to bring elements of more traditional and urban town design to what had historically been a suburban city. While retaining many characteristics of traditional shopping malls, such as large anchor stores, a food court, and vast parking lots and garages, the smaller stores are arranged as city blocks in a grid of two-lane streets, featuring lush landscaping and metered "teaser parking" in front of the stores, which open onto the sidewalk. There are two "Main Streets", which run from west to east across the center. Running from north to south between them is a pedestrian axis leading from one of the Macy's anchor stores, through a "town square" between a pair of mixed-use office buildings, to the Victoria Gardens Cultural Center, which contains the Lewis Playhouse (a 570-seat theater) and a branch of the city library. The east side of the development has Southern California's only Bass Pro Shops Outdoor World superstore; the  facility includes a Tracker Boat Center and the Islamorada Fish Company restaurant. There are restaurants throughout the center, both well-known chains and unique eateries, including California Pizza Kitchen, The Cheesecake Factory, Fleming's, Gyu-Kaku Japanese BBQ Dining, Johnny Rockets, King's Fish House, Lucille's Bar-B-Que, N7 Creamery, P.F. Chang's China Bistro, Richie's Diner, T.G.I. Friday's, and Yard House. The center features a 12-screen AMC Theatre.

Top employers
According to the city's 2018 Comprehensive Annual Financial Report, the principal employers in the city are:

Government

Local government
Rancho Cucamonga is a General Law City, incorporated in 1977 under the "Council-Manager" form of local government. The four-member Council, plus the Mayor, City Clerk, and City Treasurer, are all elected at-large by the voters of the city. The Council then appoints the City Manager, who acts as the administrative head of the city government, and is responsible for the day-to-day operations, code enforcement, and the fiscal soundness of the municipal government. The council itself serves as a local legislative body. 
The city's elections, which are plurality, are held on a Tuesday after the first Monday in November of even-numbered years.

L. Dennis Michael has been the city's mayor since 2011, with John Gillison as the city manager.

According to a city Comprehensive Annual Financial Report, the city's various funds had $278.3 million in revenues, $243.6 million in expenditures, $1,400.7 million in total assets, $492.1 million in total liabilities, and $583.3 million in cash and investments.

Politics

In 2005, the non-partisan Bay Area Center for Voting Research ranked Rancho Cucamonga as the 28th most conservative city in the United States.

Law enforcement
Since incorporation in 1977, law enforcement services in Rancho Cucamonga City have been provided through a contract with the San Bernardino County Sheriff's Department.

Rancho Cucamonga is also home to the Foothill Communities San Bernardino County Courthouse, which is housed in a building adjacent to the Rancho Cucamonga Civic Center, in a government complex located at Haven Avenue and Civic Center Drive in the city. The Civic Center houses the Rancho Cucamonga city hall, the city police department, and other local government offices.

Education

Schools
Rancho Cucamonga has multiple public K–12 schools, operating under several different school districts, within its borders: Alta Loma School District, Central School District, Cucamonga School District, Etiwanda School District, and Chaffey Joint Union High School District. Private schools include Upland Christian Academy. In addition, Rancho Cucamonga is the home to Chaffey College and satellite campuses of the University of La Verne, Cambridge College, University of Redlands, Everest College, and University of Phoenix, as well as the automotive trade school.

High Schools
Alta Loma High School
Etiwanda High School
Los Osos High School
Rancho Cucamonga High School

Libraries
The city of Rancho Cucamonga has two public libraries, with a combined total of over 200,000 volumes. The library at 7368 Archibald Avenue opened in 1994 and was remodeled in the summer of 2008. The Paul A. Biane library at 12505 Cultural Center Drive at the Victoria Gardens Cultural Center opened in August 2006. In 2013, the Rancho Cucamonga Public Library was a recipient of the National Medal for Museum and Library Services, the nation's highest honor that can be bestowed on a Library or Museum.

Infrastructure

Rancho Cucamonga's location at the base of the San Gabriel Mountains has necessitated the use of numerous control channels and basins to reduce the seasonal flood danger from the several streams descending from the range. In past years, some of the city's roads were known for flooding. Hermosa Avenue, in particular, now features many high curbs and extra-large storm drain grates to reduce flooding.

Transportation
Rancho Cucamonga is served by Omnitrans bus service,  train service from Metrolink's Rancho Cucamonga station on the San Bernardino Line, and nearby Ontario International Airport, one of four major Los Angeles-area passenger airports with multiple daily flights by most domestic carriers as well as a major shipping hub for companies like UPS and FedEx.

Interstate 15 (I-15) and State Route 210 (SR-210) run through Rancho Cucamonga as well as the historic U.S. Route 66 (as Foothill Boulevard).

I-15 sits atop an elevated berm, and cuts a curve through the southeastern part of the city, isolating a mostly industrial area, a small shopping center, and several housing tracts from the larger part of the city. Further north, I-15 forms part of the northeastern border with neighboring Fontana before entering the Cajon Pass through the San Gabriel Mountains. I-15 provides connectivity with the High Desert, Nevada, and points north for the Inland Empire and much of Southern California.

SR-210 runs nearly straight east–west through the northern part of the city, roughly bisecting the residential communities of Alta Loma and Etiwanda, providing connection (in addition to I-10 and SR-60) from the San Gabriel Valley and points west to the San Bernardino area.

Utilities
Rancho Cucamonga receives natural gas from the Southern California Gas Company. The city's water supply and sewage are managed by the Cucamonga Valley Water District. Garbage collection is by Burrtec Disposal, phone service is from Frontier Communications and cable TV is provided by Charter Communications.

Electric power in Rancho Cucamonga is provided by Southern California Edison and the Rancho Cucamonga Municipal Utility, and the city is also home to the Reliant Energy Etiwanda Generating Station, on Etiwanda Avenue. This facility, one of five Reliant stations in California, is a natural gas-fired power plant, which began operation in 1963. At  net capacity, it is Reliant's second-highest capacity plant on the West Coast. It utilizes four steam turbine generators; of which units three and four remained active after turbines one and two, as well as a combustion turbine, were retired in 2003 and 2004, respectively.

On November 29, 2011, the Inland Empire Utilities Agency installed the first wind turbine in Rancho Cucamonga.

In popular culture
The name "Cucamonga" became well known to fans of Jack Benny's popular radio program, in which an announcer, voiced by Mel Blanc, would call out: "Train leaving on track five for Anaheim, Azusa and Cu-camonga!" This running gag became so well known that it eventually led to a statue of Benny in Cucamonga.

The city is the primary setting of the TV series Workaholics and the feature film Next Friday. Further mention of the city was made in the Netflix series Unsolved.

The city was claimed as the location where the "Flamin' Hot" flavor of Cheetos was created in the 1980s at the Frito-Lay factory.

In Simson's episode Margical Mystery Tour, one of the books in the library reads "Rancho Cucomunga, Globe Painting Capital of the World"

Cucamonga is referenced in the Grateful Dead song "Pride of Cucamonga" on the From the Mars Hotel album, and in "Cucamonga" on Frank Zappa’s album Bongo Fury.

See also
 List of people from Rancho Cucamonga, California
 List of U.S. cities with large Hispanic populations

References

External links

Rancho Cucamonga Chamber of Commerce
The History of Casa de Rancho Cucamonga at citivu.com

 
Cities in San Bernardino County, California
Pomona Valley
Populated places in San Bernardino County, California
Incorporated cities and towns in California
1977 establishments in California